The Rivière Port-Daniel du Milieu flows in the administrative region of Gaspésie–Îles-de-la-Madeleine, Quebec, Canada. More specifically, this river crosses successively:
 the southern part of the unorganized territory of Rivière-Bonaventure (township of Weir), in the Bonaventure Regional County Municipality; and
 the municipality of Port-Daniel–Gascons, in the MRC Le Rocher-Percé Regional County Municipality.

The "Rivière Port-Daniel du Milieu" is a tributary of the north shore of the barachois of the hamlet of "Rivière-Port-Daniel" which opens to the south in the bay of Port-Daniel, located on the North shore of Chaleur Bay; the latter in turn opens eastward onto the Gulf of St. Lawrence.

Geography 

The "Port-Daniel du Milieu river" takes its source from mountain streams in the southwest part of the township of Weir which is part of the unorganized territory of Rivière-Bonaventure. This source is located on the southern slope of the dividing line; Edgar brook (tributary of Nadeau brook) draining the north slope. The upper part of the “Rivière Port-Daniel du Milieu” flows more or less parallel to the east side of the Petite rivière Port-Daniel.

This source of the river is located at:
  east of the eastern limit of the township of Honorat, located in the unorganized territory of Rivière-Bonaventure;
  north of the limit of the township of Port-Daniel, located in the municipality of Port-Daniel–Gascons;
  Northwest of the Canadian National railway bridge which spans the mouth of the "Bacharois de Rivière-Port-Daniel".

From its source, the "Rivière Port-Daniel du Milieu" flows on  towards the South, then the South-East, especially in forest and mountainous areas, divided into the following segments:
  towards the South, forming a curve towards the East, until the confluence of the creek of the discharge of "La Chaine de Lacs" (coming from the East);
  southward, up to the limit of the municipality of Port-Daniel–Gascons;
  towards the south-east, up to the confluence of a stream (coming from the north-west);
  towards the south-east, collecting several streams, up to the confluence of a stream (coming from the west);
  towards the south-east, until the confluence of the Dubuc stream (coming from the south-west);
  towards the south-east, winding up to the confluence of the Grum stream (coming from the north);
  south-east to the confluence of the river.

The “Rivière Port-Daniel du Milieu” flows onto the north bank of the barachois in the hamlet of “Rivière-Port-Daniel du Milieu”, crossing the sandstone at low tide. This barachois is delimited on the east side by the “Pointe à la Croix” and on the south side by a jetty which juts out towards the north-east. These two strips of land are linked by the Canadian National railway bridge and by route 132.

This barachois empties on the south-east side into the "Baie de Port-Daniel du Milieu", which opens towards the south-east into Chaleur Bay.

The confluence of the river is located:
 on the west side of the hamlet of “Rivière-Port-Daniel”;

Toponymy 
The toponym "Rivière Port-Daniel du Milieu" was made official on December 5, 1968, at the Commission de toponymie du Québec.

References 

Rivers of Gaspésie–Îles-de-la-Madeleine
Regional county municipalities in Gaspésie–Îles-de-la-Madeleine